Government Medical College, Manjeri, is a medical college established in Malappuram District affiliated to Kerala University of Health Sciences (KUHS), located in Manjeri around  from Malappuram. The hospital has 500 beds and 12 operation theatres with an intake of 100 students every year.

It is the sixth government medical college in the Kerala, inaugurated on 1 September 2013 by then Kerala Chief Minister Oommen Chandy and well facilitated by Kerala Chief Minister Pinarayi Vijayan since 2016. Manjeri Govt. Medical College is one among the newly sanctioned four medical colleges in Kerala. It was allowed for Malappuram district in revised 2011 state budget by Finance Minister K.M. Mani in July 2011.

Progress
The new medical college is being set up by upgrading the 520-bedded General hospital at Manjeri. Land acquisition for additional space has been done few months back.

How to reach
By road: Nearest KSRTC bus station is at Up Hill, Malappuram. Plenty of buses ply between the station and the college. The nearest private bus stands are at Manjeri town.

References 

Medical colleges in Kerala
Manjeri
Universities and colleges in Malappuram district
Manjeri